Fire It Up is the twenty-second and final studio album by Joe Cocker, released on 6 November 2012 by Sony/Columbia in Europe. It was recorded at Emblem Studios Calabasas, California and like Cocker's previous album, Hard Knocks, it was produced by Matt Serletic. The album was released as a regular jewel case edition as well as a premium edition with additional DVD.

Track listing
 "Fire It Up" (Alan Frew, Johnny Reid, Marty Dodson) - 3:53
 "I'll Be Your Doctor" (Jeff Trott, Victoria Horn, Steven McMorran) - 3:32
 "You Love Me Back" (Steve Diamond, Stephanie Bentley, Dennis Matkosky) - 3:55
 "I Come in Peace" (Rick Brewster, Ross Wilson) - 4:20
 "You Don't Need a Million Dollars" (Rob Giles) - 3:56
 "Eye on the Prize" (Marc Broussard, Courtlan Clement, Chad Gilmore, De Marco Johnson, Jamie Kenney, Calvin Turner) - 4:09
 "Younger" (Gary Burr) - 4:13
 "You Don't Know What You're Doing to Me" (Tyler Hilton, Wayne Kirkpatrick) - 3:52
 "The Letting Go" (Charlie Evans, Joss Stone, Graham Lyle) - 3:30
 "I'll Walk in the Sunshine Again" (Keith Urban) - 3:14
 "Weight of the World" (Kevin Bowe, Joe Stark) - 3:59
 "The Last Road" (Matt Serletic, Aimée Proal, Dave Katz, Sam Hollander) - 4:04 [Premium edition bonus track]
 "Walk Through the World with Me" (Marc Cohn, John Leventhal) - 4:20 [Premium edition bonus track]
 "Let Love Decide" (Gary Barlow, Jeffrey Steele) - 2:50 (bonus track)  [iTunes bonus track]

Premium edition DVD (Directed by Cole Walliser and filmed in Los Angeles, Sept 2012)
 "Fire It Up" (Alan Frew, Johnny Reid, Marty Dodson)
 "I'll Be Your Doctor" (Jeff Trott, Victoria Horn, Steve McMorran)
 "You Love Me Back" (Steve Diamond, Stephanie Bentley, Dennis Matkosky)
 "Eye on the Prize" (Marc Broussard, Courtlan Clement, Chad Gilmore, De Marco Johnson, Jamie Kenney, Calvin Turner)
 "I Come in Peace" (Rick Brewster, Ross Wilson)
 "You Don't Need a Million Dollars" (Rob Giles)

 Line-up: Joe Cocker – lead vocals; Nick Milo and Steve Grove – keyboards; Gene Black – guitars; Oneida James-Rebeccu – bass; Jack Bruno – drums; Nikki Tillman and Kara Britz – backing vocals

Personnel 
 Joe Cocker – lead vocals
 Jamie Muhoberac – keyboards
 Matt Serletic – keyboards, programming, horn arrangements (2, 9)
 Alex Arias – additional programming
 Mike Finnigan – Hammond B3 organ (4), backing vocals (4)
 Ray Parker Jr. – guitar (1-5, 8-11)
 Joel Shearer – guitar (1, 4-11)
 Tim Pierce – guitar (2, 3, 4)
 Tom Bukovac – guitar (6, 10)
 Chris Chaney – bass 
 Dorian Crozier – drums, percussion
 Cleto Escobedo III – baritone saxophone (2, 9)
 George Shelby – alto saxophone (2, 9), tenor saxophone (2, 9)
 Jeff Babko – trombone (2, 9)
 John Daversa – trumpet (2, 9)
 Jamie Hovorka – trumpet (2, 9)
 RDVZ A Capella Group: Melanie Fernandez, Richie Ferris, Jeremy Hitch, Anh Nguyen, Melinda Porto and Nicholas Tubbs – backing vocals (1, 4, 5, 10)
 Sherree Brown – backing vocals (2, 3, 11)
 Mabvuto Carpenter – backing vocals (2, 11)
 Ayana Williams – backing vocals (2, 11)
 Kara Britz – backing vocals (3, 4)
 Julia Waters – backing vocals (6)
 Maxine Waters – backing vocals (6)

Production 
 Matt Serletic – producer 
 James Brown – recording
 Ryan Hewitt – recording 
 Doug Trantow – additional engineer, Pro Tools editing
 Alex Arias – assistant engineer, Pro Tools recording
 Ryan Kern – assistant engineer, Pro Tools recording, music copyist 
 Mike Leisz – assistant engineer, Pro Tools recording
 Eryk Rich – assistant engineer
 Nigel Lundemo – Pro Tools recording
 Jim "Bud" Monti – Pro Tools recording
 Chris Lord-Alge – mixing 
 Andrew Schubert – additional mixing, mix assistant 
 Brad Townsend – additional mixing, mix assistant 
 Ted Jensen – mastering 
 Kelli Musgrave – production coordinator 
 Ryan Corey – design 
 Jeri Heiden – art direction, additional photography 
 Cole Walliser – photography
 Albert Mendonca – photography styling

Studios
 Recorded at Emblem Studios (Calabasas, California).
 Mixed at Mix LA (Los Angeles, California).
 Mastered at Sterling Sound (New York City, New York).

Charts

Certifications

References

2012 albums
Joe Cocker albums
Columbia Records albums
Albums produced by Matt Serletic